The Corn Islands are two islands about  east of the Caribbean coast of Nicaragua, constituting one of 12 municipalities of the South Caribbean Coast Autonomous Region. The official name of the municipality is Corn Island (the English name is officially used in Spanish-speaking Nicaragua).

History

According to Edward Conzemius, a French ethnologist from Luxembourg, in 1929 he stated in his article Les Îles Corn du Nicaragua (The Corn Islands of Nicaragua), that the first inhabitants of Corn Island were the indigenous Kukras, who were exterminated by the also indigenous Miskitos in alliance with the English buccaneers.

The island was used to resupply firewood, water, repair their ships and as a support for their fishing activities. Puritan settlers of British origin arrived on the island in the mid-18th century, bringing with them their slaves of African origin. It is known that they came from Jamaica, settling in British Honduras (now Belize) until they reached the Atlantic coast of Nicaragua.

The first settler inhabitants inhabited preferably the southeastern part of the island. This had its reasons: Quinn Hill's height offered a panoramic view of the sea, from where they could see the arrival of pirate ships as they approached "Insurance Harbor", a strategic port on the Island, which provided facilities for anchoring and unloading boats. This port "Insurance Harbor" also has historical importance since Colonel Alexander McDonald, superintendent of British Honduras (today Belize), landed on August 27, 1841.

This superintendent was the one who ordered to call the slaves, at the point called South West Bay, to declare them free from slavery, in the name of Queen Victoria of Great Britain and King Robert Charles Frederick of the Mosquitia.

After the establishment of the English colonists in the Corn Islands, a process of acculturation began. Most of the settlers came to these Islands as adventurers and explorers in search of fortunes and riches. They settled permanently interrelating with the slaves. A product of this relationship arises the Creole descent of Corn Island. Over time, these descendants gradually assimilated and adapted the customs and traditions of English culture. This is how the genetic profile of the Corn Island Creole ethnic group emerged.

Eleven years after the emancipation from slavery, on August 25, 1852, Reverend Edward Kelly from British Honduras founded the Ebenezer Baptist Church and School, the first church and educational center on the Island. Kelly was the one who evangelized the Cornaileños, since in previous years the Moravians made the attempt but could not.

Corn Island along with the eastern half of Nicaragua was a protectorate of the British Empire from 1655 to 1894, a period in which the region was called the Mosquito Coast. At some point, the islands were frequented by Caribbean pirates. In 1894 the Nicaraguan government claimed the area. The islands were handed over to the United States for a 99-year lease under the Bryan-Chamorro Treaty of August 5, 1914: under the terms of that treaty they were subject to US law but Nicaraguan sovereignty was maintained.

In 1940 Corn Island was elevated to a municipality in the Zelaya Region (as the region was known at the time) by presidential decree.

The Americans maintained the right to the actual or potential use of the islands until April 25, 1971, the date on which the agreement was officially canceled with the repeal of the Chamorro-Bryan treaty, under the presidency of Anastasio Somoza Debayle, from 14 July 1970.

Before that event, the municipality had a governor and not a mayor as it is now. The mayors were previously elected in a community assembly, where apart from the highest municipal representative, the judge and secretary were also elected. The first popular vote elections where all the people participated was at the beginning of the 20th century.

Geography 

Climate
According to the Köppen climate classification, the nearby mainland region of Bluefields features a tropical rainforest climate (Köppen Af). There is a drier period from February to April, but the trade winds ensure that unlike the Pacific coast of Nicaragua, rain still falls frequently during this period. For the rest of the year when tropical low pressure dominates rainfall is extremely heavy, helped by the coast being shaped in such a manner as to intercept winds from the south as prevail during the northern summer.

Demographics
The population of the islands numbered 7,747  (census of population, Late 2020).

The islanders are mostly of Afro-descendant, English-speaking Creole people, some of whom are mixed with indigenous people.

Subdivisions
The municipality of Corn Island is subdivided into six neighborhoods (barrios), five of which are on Great Corn Island, while Little Corn Island constitutes the sixth Neighborhood:

Transportation

Automobiles, motorbikes and bicycles are the primary means of transport on the island. Most cars are used as taxis and cost 20 Cordobas for each ride of an adult person. The only other public transportation option is the bus that circles the island clockwise and costs 10 cordobas.

Little Corn Island is accessible by fast boats, usually three or four times per day depending on weather from Great Corn Island, and by a small cargo ship from the port at Southwest Bay on Great Corn Island (World Port Index No. 9775). Little Corn Island has no motor vehicles. Due to its small size, all transport on the island is done on foot.

Air 
Great Corn Island can be reached by a La Costena flight from Managua or Bluefields that arrive twice a day to Corn Island Airport.

Sea
Great Corn Island can be reached by a ferry or a small speedboat from the City of Bluefields that leaves from there every Wednesday and Saturday to the island.

Economy and tourism
Throughout most of the 20th century, the economy revolved around coconut production. During the 1960s and 1970s, commercial fishing as well as lobster and shrimp fishing became the main industry. The recent growth in tourism throughout the region, however, has also affected the islands. Tourism on the islands has grown considerably, with their many surrounding coral reefs making them a popular destination for scuba diving and snorkeling.

Barracudas, nurse sharks, hammerhead sharks, green sea turtles, and spotted eagle rays are among the marine life that can be seen around the islands.

Sports 
Baseball is a popular sport in the Corn Islands. The main stadium on the island is the Karen Tucker Baseball Stadium.

Volleyball and Football are also Sports that are played by many islanders.

Gastronomy 
The cuisine of Corn Island is varied, most of the dishes are seafood- and boco-based.

The typical dish of Corn Island is crab soup, rondon, fried fish, and rice with shrimp, among others.

Notable person
Cheslor Cuthbert, professional baseball player for the Chicago White Sox

See also

List of lighthouses in Nicaragua

References

External links

 RightSide Guide: The survival guide to the Caribbean coast of Nicaragua
 BigCornIsland.com Tourism on the Corn Islands
 2007 trip report
 Bluefields and Corn Island, a history written by Maureen Tweedy
 LittleCornIsland.net About Little Corn Island
 Corn Island Guidee

Caribbean islands of Nicaragua
Municipalities of the South Caribbean Coast Autonomous Region
Lighthouses in Nicaragua
English-speaking countries and territories
Populated places in Nicaragua